The men's 800 metres event at the 2004 African Championships in Athletics was held in Brazzaville, Republic of the Congo on July 16–17.

Medalists

Results

Heats

Final

References
Results

2004 African Championships in Athletics
800 metres at the African Championships in Athletics